Davide Faraone (born 19 July 1975) is an Italian politician who is the group leader of the Italia Viva grouping in the Senate of the Republic.

See also 

 List of current Italian senators

References 

1975 births
Living people
21st-century Italian politicians
Italia Viva politicians
Deputies of Legislature XVII of Italy
Senators of Legislature XVIII of Italy
20th-century Italian people
Deputies of Legislature XIX of Italy